The 1968 Soviet Chess Championship was the 36th edition of USSR Chess Championship. Held from 30 December 1968 to 1 February 1969 in Alma-Ata. The tournament was won by Lev Polugaevsky who defeats Alexander Zaitsev in a play-off match. The non-attendance of stars such as David Bronstein, Tigran Petrosian, Boris Spassky, all away at foreign tournaments made it not too strong an event, especially in conjunction with the absence of Paul Keres. Mikhail Tal was ill again, after a year in which he spent a lot of time in hospital under observation.

Table and results

Play-off

References 

USSR Chess Championships
Championship
Chess
1968 in chess
Chess